Shahrak-e Taleqani (also Romanized as Shahrak-e Ţāleqānī; also known as Khodā Bandeh) is a village in Abezhdan Rural District, Abezhdan District, Andika County, Khuzestan Province, Iran. At the 2006 census, its population was 217, in 40 families.

References 

Populated places in Andika County